Bogdand is a commune in Satu Mare County in Crișana, Romania. In 2011, it had a population of 2,872; out of them, 57% were Hungarian, 36% were Romanian, and 5% were Roma.

The commune is composed of four villages:

Tourist attractions
The most significant local tourist attractions are:

The Sipos László Hungarian Museum in Bogdand village.
The Holy Archangels wooden church in Corund village, built in 1723.
The Reformed Church in Ser village.

References

 D. Oltean, K. Imola, S. Vasile, N. Bledea: Ghidul Muzeului Maghiar Bogdand, Ministerul Culturii, Direcția pentru Miorități Naționale

Communes in Satu Mare County
Localities in Crișana